= Mullins trailer =

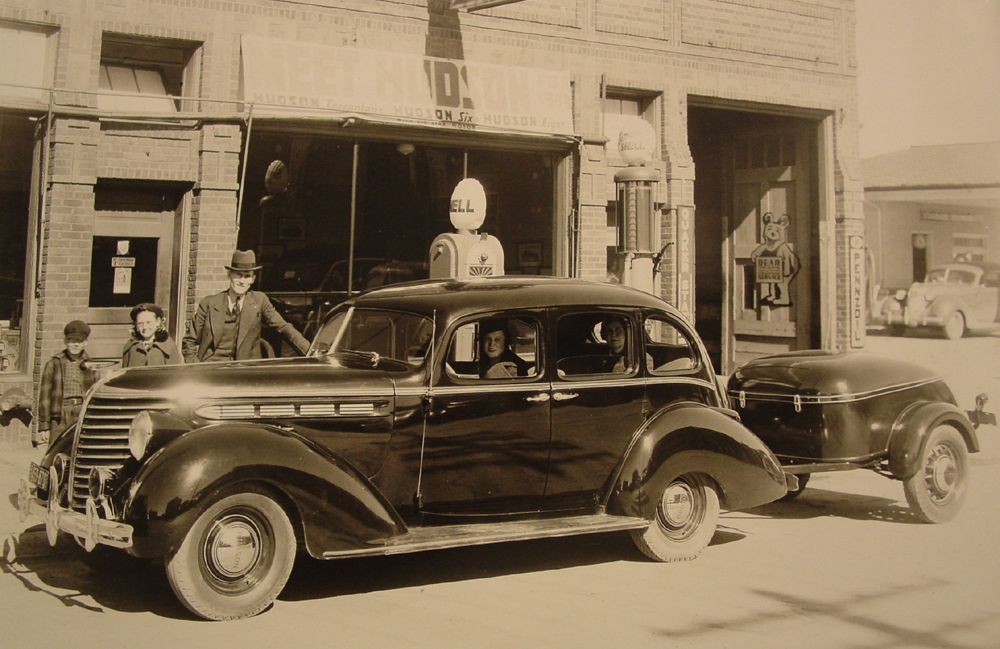
New 1938 Hudson with Mullins Red Cap Trailer

Sales receipt for Mullins Red Cap Trailer from 1938

The Mullins Trailer was developed by The (Mullins Metal Stamping Company 1894–1974), located in Salem, Ohio.

"The Mullins Manufacturing Company produced this trailer from 1936 to 1938. It was the only all-steel two-wheel auto trailer on the market at the time. Selling for $119.50, it was an immediate hit with the public."

The name "Red Cap" came from the railway baggage porters of that time. They wore a red cap to stand out from the crowd at a busy train station. Automobiles did not have much of a trunk in those days, and suitcases had to be placed inside the car or on racks. This presented an opportunity for the sale of Mullins utility trailers.
